The Nigeria Mortgage Refinance Company Plc (NMRC) was incorporated on 24 June 2013 as a public limited liability company registered with the Securities & Exchange Commission (SEC) and regulated by the Central Bank of Nigeria (CBN) as a non-deposit taking financial institution with the core activity of refinancing mortgages.

NMRC was set up to bridge the funding cost of residential mortgages and promote the availability as well as the affordability of good housing to Nigerians by providing increased liquidity in the mortgage market through the mortgage and commercial banks.

History 
Nigeria Mortgage Refinance Company (NMRC) was incorporated as a public limited liability company licensed to provide mortgage-lending institutions with access to long-term finance at an affordable interest rate, thereby enabling mortgages to be issued by these institutions to Nigerians, at longer tenors and affordable rates.

NMRC obtained an Approval-in-principle from the CBN on 20 June 2013. The company became incorporated on 24 June 2013 as Nigeria Mortgage Refinance Company Plc and were issued their licence for operations on February 18, 2015.

Leadership 
The NMRC’s board of directors are responsible for the formulation of policies and strategies of the Company.

Awards 
Nigeria Mortgage Refinance Company (NMRC) received the award for ‘Mortgage Bank of the Year’ category at the eighth edition of the African Banker Awards held in Kigali, Rwanda.

Branches and Subsidiaries 
The Nigeria Mortgage Refinance Company Plc (NMRC) has 18 pilot States in Nigeria where the governors have already committed to supporting the NMRC initiative by creating an enabling environment for mortgage orientation to be refinanced by the company include Abia, Anambra, Bauchi, Bayelsa, Delta, Edo, Ekiti, Enugu, Gombe, Kaduna, Kano, Kwara, Lagos, Nasarawa, Ogun, Ondo and the FCT.

The Nigeria Mortgage Refinance Company Plc (NMRC) has about 20 member mortgage lending banks;

Sterling Bank Plc
Access  Bank Plc
Heritage Bank Plc
Stanbic IBTC Bank Plc
Infinity Trust Mortgage Bank Plc.
Homebase Mortgage Limited
FHA Homes Savings & Loans Limited
Trust Bond Mortgage Bank
Imperial Homes Mortgage Bank
Abbey Mortgage Bank Plc
Resort Savings & Loans Limited
Platinum Mortgage Bank Limited
Jubilee Life Savings & Loans Limited
Haggai Savings & Loans Limited
Refuge Home Savings & Loans Limited
New Prudential Building Society
Sun Trust Bank
Nigeria Police Mortgage Bank Limited
Mayfresh Savings & Loans Limited

Mode Of Operations 

Refinancing Cycle

Initial step is for a borrower to take out a mortgage loan from a participating mortgage lender based on the uniform underwriting criteria set by NMRC; in return the borrower will provide regular repayments of the loan principal plus interest. The borrower will also provide collateral in the form of a mortgage over the property to be purchased.

Second step is for the participating mortgage lenders to refinance the loans with NMRC. NMRC will refinance the mortgage loans of banks with recourse to the financial institutions. The participating mortgage lender will in turn, provide security over its mortgage portfolio in favour of NMRC.

The third step is for NMRC to raise its own funding by accessing the capital markets and issuing bonds. It will issue corporate bonds, which do not involve any pass through of the credit risk attached to the mortgages. NMRC acts as a simple intermediary between mortgage lenders and the capital markets. By using its size and credit worthiness, NMRC will be able to raise funds at a cheaper rate. This is attributable to the strong shareholders, strong capital base, excellent quality of assets in its books and the fact that the CBN and the SEC regulate NMRC.

See also

 Central Bank of Nigeria

References

External links 
 Overview of the NMRC

Financial services companies of Nigeria
Companies based in Lagos
2013 establishments in Nigeria
Companies established in 2013
Mortgage industry of Nigeria